Allobates marchesianus, also known as the dull rocket frog, is a species of frog in the family Aromobatidae. It is found in the Amazon Basin in Brazil, Colombia, Ecuador, Peru, and Venezuela. However, this species might represent a cryptic species complex, where at least the populations from Venezuela belong to an undescribed species.

Description
Adult males measure  and adult females  in snout–vent length. The snout is short, slightly rounded in dorsal view and acutely rounded in lateral view. The anteroventral margin of the tympanum is distinct, whereas the posterodorsal margin is obscured by the supratympanic fold. The fingers and toes bear terminal discs. The toes have very weak lateral keels and some basal webbing. The dorsum is reddish brown with small brown granules. The dorsolateral stripe is distinct, light reddish brown in color. A chocolate-brown band runs from across the snout through the eye and upper tympanum, above arm insertion, and to the groin. Females have yellow throat, chest, and belly, varying in intensity among individuals, and pale yellow blotches on the flanks. Males have light gay belly and gray to dark gray throat and chest; the flanks have white blotches.

Eggs are laid in terrestrial nests guarded by the male. The male or the female transports the tadpoles to a pond or small stream.

Habitat and conservation
It lives on the forest floor. Reproduction takes place in small pools.

It is a common species but its habitat is threatened by clear cutting, logging, forest conversion, and fires. Its range includes several protected areas.

References

marchesianus
Amphibians of Brazil
Amphibians of Colombia
Amphibians of Ecuador
Amphibians of Peru
Amphibians of Venezuela
Amphibians described in 1941
Taxonomy articles created by Polbot